Rubus dorcheae is a newly discovered Asian species of thorny fruiting shrub in Rosaceae family. 
It is native and endemic to Nepal, found only in the subtropical forests of Kathmandu. The samples of the new plant were collected for the first time from Shivapuri Nagarjun National Park in 2018 at an altitude of 1,930m. The taxon is named after plant enthusiast La Dorchee Sherpa who first came across the plant.

Description 
It closely resembles similar taxa like Rubus kumaonensis and Rubus rugosus. It can usually be distinguished from them by its taller height. In addition, it has "both leaf surfaces green, upper surface more hairy than lower surface, leaf blade margins biserrate, sepal deltoid, tomentose on both sides, margin with 7–10 appendages, apex bifurcate or trifurcate, petals spathulate, and calyx, corolla and stamens persistent in fruit." It grows as tall as 10 meters in height and flowers from August to November while fruiting/ripening from October–November.

References 

dorcheae
Flora of Asia
Flora of Nepal
Plants described in 2021